The season one of the Kannada version of Indian reality television series Bigg Boss was broadcast on ETV Kannada in 2013. The show was hosted by Sudeep. A prize amount of 50,00,000 was announced for the winner. The show lasted for 99 days starting from 24 March 2013 (Grand Premiere) to 30 June 2013 (Grand Finale). A total of 15 contestants and 2 guests had entered the show. The Bigg Boss house, located in Lonavala, was fixed with 47 cameras to capture the activities in the house. 
     
Among the four finalists, Vijay Raghavendra emerged as the title winner with maximum votes, followed by Arun Sagar as runner-up. Nikita Thukral came third and Narendra Babu was fourth. Gurudas Shenoy was the Editor-in-chief for the house reality of this season.

Housemates status

Housemates

Wild card entries

Guests

Episodes 
The episodes were broadcast by ETV Kannada channel at a time slot of 8 to 9 pm daily. After the Grand Finale, the channel continued to telecast Autograph series in which the contestants shared their experience in the house.

Programmes
 Grand Premiere: Bigg Boss Kannada 
 Daily Highlights 
 Varada Kathe Kicchana Jothe
 Super Saturday with Sudeep
 Unseen Episode
 Grand Finale: Curtain Raiser
 Grand Finale
 Grand Finale: Final Cut
 Grand Finale: Unseen Episode
 Autograph

Nominations table

Notes

: Rishikumara, being a new entry, was safe from the nomination process.
: Vachan [special rights granted by Bigg Boss during eviction] choose Chandrika to be safe from the nomination process.   
: Jayalakshmi re-entered the house after the weekly nomination process. 
: Jayalakshmi, being a new entry, was safe from nomination process but was granted the right to vote.
: Rishika entered the house after the weekly nomination process. 
: Rohan entered the house after the weekly nomination process. 
: Bigg Boss informed Thilak that all the housemates were nominated for eviction irrespective of the nomination process. Thilak was not asked to vote.
: Anushree [special rights granted by Bigg Boss] directly nominated Chandrika for eviction.
: Rishika, being a new entry, was safe from the nomination process.
: Rohan, being a new entry, was safe from the nomination process.
: Jayalakshmi [special rights granted by Bigg Boss during eviction] choose Rohan & Anushree to be directly nominated for eviction.   
: In a twist, eviction was canceled but the nomination was conducted.
: Narendra Sharma [special rights granted by Bigg Boss during nomination] choose Chandrika to be safe from the eviction.   
: In a twist, nominated candidates (Nikita, Narendra) were declared as safe, and the rest had to face eviction.  
: Chandrika was evicted after facing the public vote, but re-entered the house after a day.
: Chandrika [special rights granted by Bigg Boss during eviction] choose Arun Sagar to be safe from the nomination process. Thus, Arun became the first finalist.   
: Among the four finalists, Vijay Raghavendra, was declared as the winner after facing the public vote.

Weekly summary

Reception and viewership

As per Indiantelevision.com's news release, the show achieved the highest TRPs than any other Kannada GEC. The launch episode had a rating of 4.7 TRP and the eviction episodes on Fridays reached 6.3 TRP. The week average  was about 4.7 TRP.

Awards
GCC Puraskar Media :-
 Best Reality Show - ETV Kannada

References

External links
 
 Bigg Boss Kannada Vote

2013 Indian television seasons
Bigg Boss Kannada
Colors Kannada original programming
Kannada-language television shows